Julio Parise Loro (21 July 1920 – 5 October 2010) was an Italian prelate of the Roman Catholic Church.

Loro was born in Cologna Veneta, Italy and was ordained a priest on 15 August 1944 from the Roman Catholic religious order of the Institute of Consecrated Life. Loro was appointed auxiliary bishop of the Apostolic Vicariate of Napo as well as titular bishop of Thagamuta on 5 October 1974 and was ordained bishop on 8 December 1974. Loro was appointed Vicar Apostolic of the Apostolic Vicariate of Napo on 27 April 1978 and served until his retirement on 2 August 1996.

References
Catholic-Hierarchy

20th-century Roman Catholic bishops in Ecuador
20th-century Italian titular bishops
Italian Roman Catholic bishops in South America
1920 births
2010 deaths
Roman Catholic bishops of Napo